The inferior mesenteric vein begins in the rectum as the superior rectal vein (superior hemorrhoidal vein), which has its origin in the hemorrhoidal plexus, and through this plexus communicates with the middle and inferior hemorrhoidal veins.

The superior rectal vein leaves the lesser pelvis and crosses the left common iliac vessels with the superior rectal artery, and is continued upward as the inferior mesenteric vein.

References 

Veins of the torso
Rectum